Sayed Mohammed Hussain (1 October 1911 – 28 February 1977) was an Indian field hockey player who competed in the 1936 Summer Olympics. He belonged to the Beary society, whose mother tongue was Beary Bashe. He was the captain for the hockey club Manavadar, which was then a British protectorate. He is said to have had a melodious voice.
Muhammad Hussein worked for the Prince of Manavadar. and also represented India against South Africa in soccer in 1934.

He was described by Krishan Datta in the Times of India as "A reliable full-back, Mohammed Hussain enjoyed the trust of his captain in the final against Germany. A 'stout' defender and a 'wall' in the defence, Hussain hailed from the princely state of Manavadar which produced a sprinkling of Olympians."

He was a member of the Indian field hockey team, which won the gold medal. His position was full-back. He played four matches (of five matches played in total) including both the semifinal match against France and final match against Germany. He was then 24 years old.

He was mentioned a lot of times in the book The World's Hockey Champions 1936 by Mirza Masood, a teammate. He was the captain of the Prince of Manavadar's Team which toured New Zealand in 1938.

Practice matches for the Olympics

Practice matches in Northern India
India played her first game of the Indian tour against Delhi Select XI. India lost 1–4, even though Delhi XI was never considered a great team. The unexpected win is sometimes blamed on Sardar Mohammed Hussain for playing as inside-right, a position in which he had never played before. India won the next two matches against Jhansi Heroes and Bhopal State XI easily.

Practice matches in Northern India
India won the three matches against Madras Indians, All Madras and Bangalore without any problem. Hussain played in all these matches.

Pre-Olympic practice matches in Germany
India played eight practice matches before the Olympics. Hussain played in five of those matches. India remained undefeated.

Olympic matches
Hussain played against Hungary. He was rested in the next match against the US. India had easy wins against Japan and France later. He was part of both the matches. After the match he and the team were guests of the Berlin Mosque Committee with an invitation to take tea with the members. A long speech tracing the history of the Olympic Games and India's part therein was given by the President, and translated afterwards into the German and Arabic languages. India won the final against Germany's team 8–1.

After the Olympics
In his book The World's Hockey Champions 1936, Mirza Masood mentions a song sung by Mohammed Hussain at Konigssee, a favourite resort of Hitler on weekends. He writes "At the request of some of the members, Mohammad Hussain sang two love songs in Urdu in his clear, melodious voice. The songs took us far away from the scenic beauty of the Bavarian lake to India and her people. Isn't it strange that when we were enjoying the most the sight of the beautiful lake, a mere song put into oblivion what was so impressive a moment before, and carried us on the wings of imagination to the people whom we had long left behind? Such is the strong tie of the motherland!"

References

External links

The World's Hockey Champions 1936
Munich and Leipzig

1911 births
1977 deaths
20th-century Indian Muslims
Field hockey players from Karnataka
Olympic field hockey players of India
Field hockey players at the 1936 Summer Olympics
Indian male field hockey players
Olympic gold medalists for India
Olympic medalists in field hockey
Medalists at the 1936 Summer Olympics
People from Dakshina Kannada district